Final Destination is an American horror franchise that includes five films, two comic books, and nine novels. It is based on an unproduced spec script by Jeffrey Reddick, originally written for The X-Files television series, and was distributed by New Line Cinema. All of its five films are set around a small group of people who escape impending death after one individual (the protagonist) sees a sudden premonition and warns them about a major disaster that is about to happen. After avoiding their foretold deaths, the survivors are killed one by one in bizarre accidents caused by an unseen force creating complicated chains of cause and effect, resembling Rube Goldberg machines, and then read omens sent by another unseen entity in order to again avert their deaths.

The series is noteworthy among other horror films for its use of an antagonist that is not a stereotypical slasher or other physical being, but Death manifested, subtly manipulating circumstances in the environment with a design on claiming anyone who previously escaped their fated demise. In addition to the films, a novel series, which includes the novelizations of the first three films, was published throughout 2005 and 2006 by Black Flame. A one-shot comic book titled Final Destination: Sacrifice was released alongside select DVDs of Final Destination 3 in 2006, and a comic book series titled Final Destination: Spring Break was published by Zenescope Entertainment in 2007.

Background
Final Destination was written by Jeffrey Reddick after having "read a story about a woman who was on vacation and her mom called her and said, 'Don't take the flight tomorrow, I have a really bad feeling about it. The woman switched flights and the plane she was originally supposed to take crashed. Originally having written the script as an episode of The X Files, Reddick decided to turn the script into a feature-length film at the behest of one of his New Line Cinema colleagues. After reading his spec script, New Line Cinema hired Reddick to write the screenplay; James Wong and Glen Morgan were later brought on board to help with the script, making alterations to comply with their standards.
It was based on the fateful flight TWA 800, specifically, the 16 students and 5 adults of the Montoursville HS.

Films

Final Destination (2000)

In the original Final Destination, high school student Alex Browning (Devon Sawa) boards Volée Airlines Flight 180 with his classmates for a field trip to Paris. Before take-off, Alex has a premonition that the plane will explode in mid-air, killing everyone on board. When the events from his vision begin to repeat themselves in reality, he panics, and a fight breaks out, which leads to several passengers being left behind, including Clear Rivers (Ali Larter), Carter Horton (Kerr Smith), Billy Hitchcock (Seann William Scott), Valerie Lewton (Kristen Cloke), Terry Chaney (Amanda Detmer), and Tod Waggner (Chad Donella), who witness the plane explode moments later. Afterwards, the survivors begin to die one by one through a series of bizarre accidents, and Alex attempts to find a way to "cheat" Death's plan before it is too late. Six months later, Alex, Clear, and Carter travel to Paris to celebrate their survival, believing they have finally cheated Death; however, after Carter is crushed by a giant neon sign that falls from a building above, they realize that Death's plan is still in action.

Final Destination 2 (2003)

Final Destination 2, picking up one year after the first film, features college student Kimberly Corman (A. J. Cook) heading to Daytona Beach for spring break with her friends Shaina, Dano, and Frankie (Sarah Carter, Alex Rae, and Shaun Sipos). En route, Kimberly has a premonition of a huge car pile-up on Route 23, killing everyone involved. She stops her SUV on the entrance ramp, preventing several people from entering the highway, including state trooper Thomas Burke (Michael Landes), Eugene Dix (T. C. Carson), Rory Peters (Jonathan Cherry), Kat Jennings (Keegan Connor Tracy), Nora and Tim Carpenter (Lynda Boyd and James Kirk), Evan Lewis (David Paetkau), and pregnant Isabella Hudson (Justina Machado). While Officer Burke questions Kimberly, the pile-up occurs as she predicted. In the days following the accident, the survivors begin to die one by one in a series of bizarre accidents. After learning about the explosion of Flight 180, Kimberly teams up with Clear Rivers, the only survivor of Flight 180, to try to save a new group of people from Death. This time the survivors are told that only "new life" can defeat Death, and they must stay alive long enough for Isabella to have her baby. It is later revealed that Isabella was never meant to die in the pile-up, and Kimberly drowns herself in a lake so that she can be resuscitated by emergency staff, thus granting her "new life"; saving her and Officer Burke.

Final Destination 3 (2006)

Final Destination 3, set five years after the explosion of Flight 180 and four years after the pile-up on Route 23, has high school student Wendy Christensen (Mary Elizabeth Winstead) visiting an amusement park for grad night with her friends Kevin Fischer (Ryan Merriman), Jason Wise (Jesse Moss), and Carrie Dreyer (Gina Holden). As Wendy and her friends board the Devil's Flight roller coaster, Wendy has a premonition that the ride will crash, killing everyone on board. When Wendy panics a fight breaks out and several people leave or are forced off the ride before the accident occurs, including Kevin, Wendy's younger sister Julie (Amanda Crew), Ian McKinley (Kris Lemche), Erin Ulmer (Alexz Johnson), Lewis Romero (Texas Battle), Frankie Cheeks (Sam Easton), Ashley Freund (Chelan Simmons), Ashlyn Halperin (Crystal Lowe), and Perry Malinowski (Maggie Ma). When the survivors start to die one by one in a series of strange accidents, Wendy and Kevin set out to save those who remain after they learn of the events of the first two films. They also figure out that the photographs they took at the park have hints of their deaths. Most of their attempts are futile, with the exception of Julie and themselves, leading them to believe they have cheated Death. However, the three "coincidentally" cross paths five months later and are caught in a horrifying subway accident.

The Final Destination (2009)

In The Final Destination, set nine years after the explosion of Flight 180, eight years after the pile-up on Route 23, and four years after the Devil's Flight disaster, college student Nick O'Bannon (Bobby Campo) visits the McKinley Speedway for a study break with his friends Lori Milligan (Shantel VanSanten), Janet Cunningham (Haley Webb), and Hunt Wynorski (Nick Zano). While watching the race, Nick has a premonition that a race car crash will send debris into the stands, causing the stadium to collapse on the guests. When Nick panics a fight breaks out and several people leave before the accident occurs, including, his friends Lori, Janet, and Hunt, security guard George Lanter (Mykelti Williamson), and spectators Andy Kewzer (Andrew Fiscella), Samantha Lane (Krista Allen), Carter Daniels (Justin Welborn), and Nadia Monroy (Stephanie Honoré). Once again, the survivors are killed in a series of strange accidents except for Janet, who is rescued just moments before her death. This leads the remaining survivors to believe that they have cheated Death, until Nick has another premonition of a disastrous explosion at a shopping mall, which he manages to prevent, saving himself, Lori, and Janet. Two weeks later, Nick realizes the mall disaster vision was only meant to lead them to where Death needed them to be and all three are killed by a runaway semi.

Final Destination 5 (2011)

In Final Destination 5, Sam Lawton (Nicholas D'Agosto) is on his way to a corporate retreat with his colleagues. While they cross the North Bay Bridge, Sam has a premonition that the bridge will collapse, killing everyone on it. Sam manages to persuade several of his co-workers to get off the bridge before the accident occurs, including Molly Harper (Emma Bell), Nathan Sears (Arlen Escarpeta), Peter Friedkin (Miles Fisher), Dennis Lapman (David Koechner), Olivia Castle (Jacqueline MacInnes Wood), Isaac Palmer (P. J. Byrne), and Candice Hooper (Ellen Wroe). After Candice and Isaac die in bizarre accidents, Sam is warned that Death is still after the survivors and told that if he wants to live he must kill someone who was never meant to die on the bridge, and claim their remaining lifespan. Olivia and Dennis are killed before they have a chance to save themselves, but Nathan claims the lifespan of a co-worker when he accidentally causes his death in a warehouse accident. Peter attempts to kill Molly, jealous that she survived instead of Candice. He eventually gains the lifespan of an investigating agent, but is killed by Sam before he can kill Molly. Sam and Molly later board a plane to Paris, which is revealed to be Flight 180 from the first film. When the fuselage is torn apart by the exploding engine fragments, Molly is sucked out of the plane while Sam is killed in the subsequent explosion. The landing gear is sent flying towards New York City and crashes into a cocktail bar, killing Nathan, since the co-worker whose life he claimed had a terminal illness and was due to die "any day now".

Future
In 2011, Tony Todd said that if Final Destination 5 was a success at the box office, then two sequels would be filmed back-to-back. On August 23, when asked whether he would be directing a sequel, Steven Quale elaborated: "Who knows. Never say never. I mean, it'll be up to the fans. We'll see how this one performs internationally, and if it makes as much money as the fourth one, I'm sure Warner Brothers will want to make another one".

In January 2019, a new installment was announced to be in development, from Warner Bros. Pictures and New Line Cinema. Patrick Melton and Marcus Dunstan will write the script, with the plot described as a "re-imagining" of the franchise. In August, Devon Sawa expressed interest in returning to the franchise in the reboot.

In March 2020, it was announced that the film, set in the same canon as the first five films, would focus on first responders, with series producer Craig Perry stating:

The same year in October, series creator Jeffrey Reddick confirmed that a sixth film had been in the works prior to the COVID-19 pandemic. By 2021, a draft of the script had been written by Lori Evans Taylor. In January 2022, Warner Bros. Pictures and New Line Cinema announced that Guy Busick would collaborate on the script with Taylor, while Jon Watts joined as a producer. Additionally, it was revealed that the film would be distributed through HBO Max. That September, it was announced that Zach Lipovsky and Adam B. Stein would co-direct the film, after the pair staged an elaborate death hoax in a Zoom call meeting with the studio executives. Producers were impressed with the duo's vision for the project and how their presentation evoked the franchise. The draft of the script at that time was co-authored by Busick and Taylor from an original story written by Jon Watts. Craig Perry, Sheila Hanahan Taylor, Watts and Dianne McGunigle will serve as producers.

Recurring cast and characters

Additional crew and production details

Reception

Box office performance
Final Destination, when compared to other top-grossing American horror franchises and adjusting for inflation from 2011, is the tenth highest grossing horror franchise in the United States at approximately $347.8million With $667million in worldwide earnings, the franchise is New Line's third most lucrative horror franchise, behind The Conjuring franchise ($2billion) and the It series ($1billion).

Critical and public response
The franchise has been praised for its innovative premise of the invisible abstract concept of Death killing people instead of a usual slasher killer, and the creativity of the films' death sequences.

Other media

Novels
Throughout 2005, publishing company Black Flame released a series of Final Destination books which faithfully follow the premise of the films, with each involving a group of people who find themselves targeted by Death after surviving a catastrophe of some sort due to a character experiencing a precognitive vision. Their first five novels all featured original stories, with the first novel, entitled Dead Reckoning, has punk rocker Jessica Golden saving herself and several others from the collapse of Club Kitty in Los Angeles, earning Death's ire. Destination Zero, also set in LA, has magazine employee Patricia Fuller and few others survive a train bombing and afterward, while being stalked by Death, Patti learns this is not the first time her family has been hunted by the entity. End of the Line has a group of New York City subway crash survivors, led by twins Danny and Louise King, trying to escape Death, who uses an unknowing agent to hasten its acquisition of the survivors. In Dead Man's Hand a group meant to die in the crash of a Las Vegas glass elevator are stalked by both Death and the FBI, the latter believing the group's savior Allie Goodwin-Gaines was responsible for the elevator crash. Looks Could Kill has beautiful New York model Stephanie "Sherry" Pulaski stopping her friends from boarding a yacht when she has a vision of it exploding, but is left horribly disfigured and comatose by flying debris moments afterward when her vision comes true; eventually awakening the embittered Stephanie makes a deal with Death, aiding it in claiming her friends in exchange for having her good looks restored.

After the run of the original series of books Black Flame released novelizations of the first three films in January 2006. Black Flame's last Final Destination novel was Death of the Senses released in mid-2006. Taking place in New York the book has a homeless man named Jack Curtis saving policewoman Amy Tom from a maniac after having a vision of Amy's death; Amy's attacker is later revealed to be a serial killer who was meant to murder six other people (representing the first five senses and a sixth) who Death begins targeting as Jack and Amy rush to find and warn the intended victims. It was, due to a printing error, only available for a short period of time before being recalled, leaving only a few copies in circulation. A tenth novel, titled Wipeout and written by Alex Johnson, was planned, but cancelled; the book would have featured a pair of surfers and several others, after surviving a plane crash in Hawaii, being hunted by Death and the survivor of another disaster, an unstable soldier who had nearly died in an ambush in Afghanistan.

Comic books
The first Final Destination comic book, titled Sacrifice, was published by Zenescope Entertainment and came packaged with a limited edition DVD of Final Destination 3, sold exclusively at Circuit City stores. The premise of the story involves the survivor of a terrible accident and his friend Jim, who continually experiences images of other people's deaths, isolating himself from the rest of the world to escape the visions that torment him. Zenescope later released a five issue miniseries, titled Final Destination: Spring Break, which involves a group led by Carly Hagan being stalked by Death after surviving a hotel fire and becoming stranded in Cancún, Mexico. The miniseries was later released in a trade paperback collection, which included the Sacrifice comic as bonus content.

Themes

Three critical theories about the Final Destination franchise have been discussed in scholarly works. It has been framed as a postmodern horror franchise that, like the Scream franchise, self-consciously refers to the history of horror cinema and rewards viewers for their knowledge. Second, the films—particularly The Final Destination (2009) and Final Destination 5 (2011)—have been examined for their visual effects. Third, the franchise has been criticized for being cynical and reductive. For example, film studies scholar Reynold Humphries dismisses the franchise as "obscurantist nonsense whose only 'idea' is that death is an agency that has a 'plan' for each of us".

According to media studies scholar Eugenie Brinkema, Final Destination films are characterized by their move away from the typical horror antagonist and toward the certainty and inevitability of death. This makes them inconsistent with most other horror films, which require a monster. Final Destination films depart further from other horror films, even those aimed at teenagers, in that a family narrative is lacking, and there are no hauntings of any kind. As well, there is no sexuality—"neither the pursuit of pleasure in the slasher convention of easy bodily access nor the monstrosity of sexual difference". Brinkema argues the films are not about seeking pleasure like typical slasher films. Instead they are about the avoidance of pain and death; they are fundamentally "bitter ... paranoid, and sad" and display the inability of characters to feel pleasure. In these films, death becomes its own cause. The premonition of the roller coaster derailment in Final Destination 3 is without context or cause. The avoidance of death by some characters grounds the necessity of their deaths, specifically the order in which they would have died on the roller coaster. Thus, "Death's list" or "Death's design" is realized. Final Destination 3 spends as much time interpreting deaths as displaying them. Wendy's close analysis of photographs allows her to understand the deaths, but is inevitably too late to save her friends. In the franchise's films, Brinkema says, "one must closely read to survive (for a spell), and yet reading changes absolutely nothing at all". Thus, the characters "might as well" have stayed on the roller coaster.

Ian Conrich, a film studies scholar, argues the series marks a key departure from slasher norms in that death itself becomes the villain. Final Destination films draw influences from slasher cinema but the franchise's action sequences, including Final Destination 3 roller coaster derailment, draw from action and disaster cinema. For Conrich, the franchise marks a new slasher film subgenre. Because the deaths are extremely violent and excessive, any number can happen at once, and all of them are inevitable, he calls the films "grand slashers". Other grand slashers include the films in the Saw and Cube franchises.

A notable feature of the Final Destination films is the threshold or tipping-point logic of characters' deaths. Conrich frames the complex death sequences in Final Destination films as "death games, contraptions or puzzles in which there are only losers". He compares the sequences to Rube Goldberg machines, the Grand Guignol, and the Mouse Trap board game. Brinkema selects the deaths of Ashley and Ashlyn from Final Destination 3 as epitomizing the series' death sequences. The characters' deaths are brought about by "a series of neutral gestures, a set of constraints that will ultimately lead to their conflagratory ends"; these include the placing of a drink, looking through CDs, and an ill-chosen doorstop. The scene uses logics of temperature, color, and light to realize the characters' deaths, and to allow Wendy to recognize the threat they face. An example of the "literal tipping point" at which the characters can no longer escape occurs when a coat rack is knocked onto the tanning beds; it is blown by an air conditioning unit that is activated by the increasing heat. Conrich identifies the roller coaster derailment as an example of the franchise's focus on mobility in death sequences. He argues that theme park rides and horror cinema are mutually influential; the former draw from the frightening aspects of the latter, while the latter draw from the "theatrics and kinetics" of the former.

Notes

References

Bibliography

External links

 
 Final Destination franchise at The Numbers

 
American film series
Film series introduced in 2000
Horror film franchises
New Line Cinema franchises
Fiction about precognition
Multiple time paths in fiction
Films adapted into comics
2000s English-language films
2010s English-language films